Paid protestors or professional protestors are people who participate in public outrage or objection in exchange for payment. The expression may be directed against individuals, organizations and governments or against protests against the government with the aim of breaking up or discrediting a protest. In some contexts, people may be hired for optics to show increased public participation in the democratic process. Two parliaments have debated paid protesting, the Kyrgyz parliament and the Indian parliament, and allegations without evidence were frequently made by former United States President Donald Trump and his supporters throughout his presidency. 

The larger the crowd, the less likely is it that they entirely consist of professional or paid protestors. Paid protestors may not be aware of the matter in consideration. Similar terms that have been used to refer to similar concepts include paid protest, rent-a-crowd, rent-a-mob, activists-for-hire, protest-on-hire, fake protestors/ fake protests and mercenaries.

Conspiracy theories about paid or professional protestors and coordinated protests by groups like antifa and supposed "global elites" (i.e. George Soros conspiracies or QAnon)  were common throughout the presidency of Donald Trump, and both right-leaning and left-leaning misinformation circles promote allegations of "paid or otherwise organized protestors".

Examples 

In Kyrgyzstan, the acronym OBON, which expands to "Otryad Bab Osobogo Naznacheniya" in the Kyrgyz language and can be translated as "special-assignment female units", refers to hired female protestors. The benefits of this is that it is a cheap way to populate a protest site as well as reduce the probability of violent confrontation with the police and other security forces. The remuneration for this has also been discussed by Kyrgyzstan media.

In Indonesia, reports of paid protests surfaced during the 2017 Jakarta gubernatorial election, the 2014 Indonesian presidential election and during the 2001 clash between two Indonesian Presidents Megawati Sukarnoputri and Abdurrahman Wahid. During the 2013–2014 Bulgarian protests various accusations were made against groups of protestors and counter-protests being paid. In 2014, protestors in Pakistan told BBC that they were hired to protest for Imran Khan and Tahirul Qadri. 

In 2018, the Additional Solicitor General of India used the phrase in the Supreme Court of India, "We are in an era where there are some professional protestors who like to protest outside the apex court, Parliament, President’s house or Prime Minister’s house. They don’t like any other alternative place for protests". The Shaheen Bagh protests in India were accused of being a paid protest. The protestors in turn put up posters and conveyed through the media that it was not a paid protest and that the protestors were not doing it for money.

Former U.S. President Donald Trump often made unfounded claims about paid or professional protestors throughout his presidency.  For example he used the phrase "professional protesters" in a tweet following protests against his election victory. Similar accusations were made against participants in the Dakota Access Pipeline protests in 2016 and 2017. There have been public claims of organizations such as Crowds on Demand providing paid protestors, or pay for protesting.

In the United Kingdom, concerns and accusations related to paid protests have been reported. During the visit of Tamim al-Thani to London in 2018, a paid protest took place outside Downing Street.

Variants 
In Indonesia, the term "nasi bungkus brigade" or the "boxed lunch crowd" has been coined to refer to paid protestors. The Hindi phrase  translates to "protest lifeforms". The phrase was used by the Indian Prime Minister in the parliament of India.

References 
Notes

Citations

Further reading 

 Abby Ohlheiser (18 January 2017). How a hoax website about paid protesters came crumbling down live on TV. The Washington Post.
Archanaa Seker (9 January 2020). The price we pay for protesting. The New Indian Express.
Tanvi Akhauri (6 February 2021). Was Rihanna Paid To Tweet On Farmers’ Protest? Here’s What We Know. SheThePeople.
Li Zhou (3 June 2020). The trope of "outside agitators" at protests, explained. Vox.

Humour and satire

 Colin Stokes (16 November 2016). The Perks Of Being A Professional Protester. McSweeney's.
 Rex Huppke (27 February 2017). Proof that liberal protesters are paid. Chicago Tribune.

Protests